Hugh Martin (born 3 August 1947) is a South African cricketer. He played ten first-class matches for Transvaal B and New South Wales between 1970/71 and 1971/72.

See also
 List of New South Wales representative cricketers

References

External links
 

1947 births
Living people
South African cricketers
Gauteng cricketers
New South Wales cricketers
People from Chivhu